Survival of the Sickest may refer to:

 Survival of the Sickest (album), an album by American rock band Saliva
 "Survival of the Sickest" (song), a 2004 song by American rock band Saliva
 Survival of the Sickest (book), a 2007 book by Canadian-American author Sharon Moalem